Celaenorrhinus plagiatus, commonly known as Berger's black sprite, is a species of butterfly in the family Hesperiidae. It is found in Sierra Leone, Liberia, Ivory Coast, Ghana, Nigeria, Cameroon and the Democratic Republic of the Congo. The habitat consists of clearings in forests.

References

Butterflies described in 1976
plagiatus